Neuhemsbach is a municipality in the district of Kaiserslautern, in Rhineland-Palatinate, western Germany.

Known People 
 Birthplace of Karl Bischoff.

References

Municipalities in Rhineland-Palatinate
Palatinate Forest
North Palatinate
Kaiserslautern (district)